Cardiovascular Drugs and Therapy is a bimonthly peer-reviewed medical journal covering pharmacotherapy as it relates to cardiology. It was established in 1987 and is published by Springer Science+Business Media.The editor-in-chief is Yochai Birnbaum (Baylor College of Medicine). According to the Journal Citation Reports, the journal has a 2020 impact factor of 3.727.

References

External links

Pharmacotherapy journals
Cardiology journals
Springer Science+Business Media academic journals
Publications established in 1987
Bimonthly journals
English-language journals
Academic journals associated with international learned and professional societies of Europe